A World of Music was a Canadian musical variety television series which aired on CBC Television for 13 weeks in 1966.

Premise
This series was hosted by folk singers Malka & Joso (Malka Himel and Joso Spraljia) who presented music in various languages from various cultures. Guests included Ian and Sylvia, Miriam Makeba, Odetta, Jan Rubeš, Sonny Terry with Brownie McGhee and Yma Sumac.

Production
Mark Warren produced the series with Alex Barris as chief writer. Episodes were broadcast in colour starting October 1966. Rudy Toth was series musical director with choreography by Andy Body.

Scheduling
The half-hour series aired Saturdays from approximately 10:30 p.m., following Hockey Night in Canada. The series ran from 17 September to 10 December 1966.

Demise
A World of Music was a replacement for the popular Juliette series. Its post-hockey ratings were considerably lower than the previous series and the ethnic content received hostility from some viewers. Alex Barris later attempted to reduce the multicultural approach on the series, a move which caused division between the production staff and the cast. After thirteen weeks, the show was cancelled.

References

External links
 

CBC Television original programming
1966 Canadian television series debuts
1966 Canadian television series endings